Martin Blume Jr. Farm is a historic home and farm located in St. Joseph Township, Allen County, Indiana.  The farmhouse was built in 1885, and is a two-story, Italianate style brick dwelling with a low hipped roof.  Also on the property are the contributing large three bay timber frame threshing barn (c. 1883), timber frame hog barn (c. 1889), storage barn (c. 1899), brooder house, windmill frame, brick smokehouse, and privy.

It was listed on the National Register of Historic Places in 2006.

References

Farms on the National Register of Historic Places in Indiana
Italianate architecture in Indiana
Houses completed in 1885
Buildings and structures in Allen County, Indiana
National Register of Historic Places in Allen County, Indiana